Philip Stapleton Humberston (1812 – 16 January 1891) was a British Conservative politician.

Humberston was elected Conservative MP for City of Chester at the 1859 general election and held the seat until 1865 when he did not seek re-election.

References

External links
 

UK MPs 1859–1865
1812 births
1891 deaths
Conservative Party (UK) MPs for English constituencies